In computer algebra, a triangular decomposition of a polynomial system  is a set of simpler polynomial systems  such that a point is a solution of  if and only if it is a solution of one of the systems .

If the coefficients of the polynomial systems  are real numbers, then the real solutions of   can be obtained by a triangular decomposition into regular semi-algebraic systems. In both cases, each of these simpler systems has a triangular shape and remarkable properties, which justifies the terminology.

History 
The Characteristic Set Method is the first factorization-free algorithm, which was proposed for decomposing an algebraic variety into equidimensional components.  Moreover, the Author, Wen-Tsun Wu, realized an implementation of this method and reported experimental data in his 1987 pioneer article titled "A zero structure theorem for polynomial equations solving". To put this work into context, let us recall what was the common idea of an algebraic set decomposition at the time this article was written.

A subset  is an (affine) algebraic variety over  if there exists a polynomial set  such that the zero set  of  equals .

A first algebraic variety decomposition result is the famous Lasker–Noether theorem which implies the following.

Theorem (Lasker - Noether). For each algebraic variety  there exist finitely many irreducible algebraic varieties  such that we have

In order to lead to a computer program, this algorithm specification  should prescribe how irreducible components are represented.  Such an encoding is introduced  by Joseph Ritt  through the following result.

Theorem (Ritt).

We call the set  in Ritt's Theorem a Ritt characteristic set of the ideal . Please refer to regular chain for the notion of a triangular set.

Joseph Ritt described  a method for solving polynomial systems  based on polynomial factorization over field extensions and computation of characteristic sets of prime ideals.

Deriving a practical implementation of this method, however,  was and remains a difficult problem. In the 1980s, when the Characteristic set Method was introduced,  polynomial factorization was an active research area and certain fundamental questions on this subject were solved  recently

Nowadays, decomposing an algebraic variety into irreducible components is not essential to process most application problems, since weaker notions of decompositions, less costly to compute, are sufficient.

The Characteristic Set Method relies on the following variant of Ritt's Theorem.

Theorem (Wen-Tsun Wu). For any finite polynomial set , one can compute a reduced triangular set  such that  all polynomial  in  reduces to zero by pseudo-division w.r.t .

Different concepts and algorithms extended the work of Wen-Tsun Wu. In the early 1990s, the notion of a regular chain, introduced independently by Michael Kalkbrener in 1991 in his PhD Thesis and, by Lu Yang and Jingzhong Zhang led to important algorithmic discoveries.

In Kalkbrener's vision, regular chains are used to represent the generic zeros of the irreducible components of an algebraic variety.  In the original work of Yang and Zhang, they are used to decide whether a hypersurface intersects a quasi-variety (given by a regular chain).  Regular chains have, in fact, several interesting properties and are the key notion in many algorithms for decomposing systems of algebraic or differential equations.

Regular chains have been investigated in many papers.

The abundant literature on the subject can be explained by the many equivalent definitions of a regular chain. Actually, the original formulation of Kalkbrener is quite  different from that of Yang and Zhang.  A bridge between these two notions, the point of view of Kalkbrener and that of Yang and Zhang, appears in Dongming Wang's paper.

There are various algorithms available for obtaining triangular decomposition of  both in the sense of Kalkbrener and in the sense of Lazard and Wen-Tsun Wu. The Lextriangular Algorithm by Daniel Lazard and the Triade Algorithm by Marc Moreno Maza together with the Characteristic Set Method are available in various computer algebra systems, including Axiom and Maple.

Formal definitions 
Let  be a field and  be ordered variables. We denote by  the corresponding polynomial ring. The first one is to decompose lazily, by representing only the generic points of the algebraic set  in the so-called sense of Kalkbrener.

 

 

Please refer to regular chain for definitions of these notions.

Assume from now on that  is a real closed field. There exist finitely many regular semi-algebraic systems  such that we have

The regular semi-algebraic systems  form a triangular decomposition of the semi-algebraic system .

Examples 
Denote  the rational number field. In  with variable ordering , consider the following polynomial system: 

According to the Maple code: with(RegularChains):
R := PolynomialRing([x, y, z]):
sys := {x^2+y+z-1, x+y^2+z-1, x+y+z^2-1}:
l := Triangularize(sys, R):

See also 
Wu's method of characteristic set
Regular chain
Regular semi-algebraic system

References 

Equations
Algebra
Polynomials
Algebraic geometry
Computer algebra
Computer algebra systems